Morteza Mansouri (Persian: مرتضی منصوری born 23 june 1990) is an Iranian footballer who plays for Nassaji Mazandaran in the Persian Gulf League.

Mansouri played for Hafari Ahvaz in the Azadegan League making 21 appearances for them. He made his debut in the Persian Gulf League for Esteghlal Ahvaz on 26 September 2015 in a home defeat to Gostaresh Foolad Tabriz.

Club career

Sepahan

Last Update:7 september 2019

References 

Iranian footballers
Living people
Esteghlal Ahvaz players
1994 births
Association football defenders